A shallow foundation is a type of building foundation that transfers structural load to the earth very near to the surface, rather than to a subsurface layer or a range of depths, as does a deep foundation. Customarily, a shallow foundation is considered as such when the width of the entire foundation is greater than its depth. In comparison to deep foundations, shallow foundations are less technical, thus making them more economical and the most widely used for relatively light structures.

Types of shallow foundation 
Footings are always wider than the members that they support. Structural loads from a column or wall are usually greater than 1000kPa, while the soil's bearing capacity is commonly less than that (typically less than 400kPa). By possessing a larger bearing area, the foundation distributes the pressure to the soil, decreasing the bearing pressure to within allowable values. A structure is not limited to one footing. Multiple types of footings may be used in a construction project.

Wall footing 

Also called strip footing, this footing is a continuous strip that supports structural and non-structural load bearing walls. Found directly under the wall, Its width is commonly 2-3 times wider than the wall above it.

Isolated footing 
Also called single-column footing, it is a square, rectangular, or circular slab that supports the structural members individually. Generally, each of its columns gets its footing to transmit and distribute the load of the structure towards the soil underneath. Sometimes, an isolated footing can be sloped or stepped at the base to spread greater loads. This type of footing is used when the structural load is relatively low, columns are widely spaced, and the soil's bearing capacity is adequate at a shallow depth.

Combined footing 
When more than one column shares the same footing, these are called combined footing. Utilized when the spacing of the columns is too restricted, that if isolated footing were used, they would overlap one another. Also, when property lines make isolated footings eccentrically loaded, combined footings are preferred.

When the load among the columns is equal, the combined footing may be rectangular. Conversely, when the load among the columns is unequal, the combined footing should be trapezoidal.

Strap footing 

A strap footing is when individual columns are connected to one another with the use of a strap beam. The general purpose of a strap footing is alike to those of a combined footing, where the spacing is possibly limited and/or the columns are adjacent to the property lines.

Mat foundation 
Also called raft foundation, it is a single continuous slab that covers the entirety of the base of a building. Mat foundations support all the loads of the structure and transmit them to the ground evenly. Soil conditions may prevent other footings from being used. Since this type of foundation distributes the load coming from the building uniformly over a considerably large area, it is favored when individual footings are unfeasible due to the low bearing capacity of the soil.

Slab-on-grade foundation

Slab-on-grade or floating slab foundations are a structural engineering practice whereby the concrete slab that is to serve as the foundation for the structure is formed from a mold set into the ground. The concrete is then placed into the mold, leaving no space between the ground and the structure.  This type of construction is most often seen in warmer climates, where ground freezing and thawing is less of a concern and where there is no need for heat ducting underneath the floor. That being said, Frost Protected Shallow Foundations (or FPSF) which are used in areas of potential Frost Heave, are a form of Slab on Grade Foundations.

Remodeling or extending such a structure may also be more difficult.  Over the long term, ground settling (or subsidence) may be a problem, as a slab foundation cannot be readily jacked up to compensate; proper soil compaction prior to pour can minimize this.  The slab can be decoupled from ground temperatures by insulation, with the concrete poured directly over insulation (for example, extruded polystyrene foam panels), or heating provisions (such as hydronic heating) can be built into the slab.

Slab-on-grade foundations are commonly used in areas with expansive clay soil. While elevated structural slabs actually perform better on expansive clays, it is generally accepted by the engineering community that slab-on-grade foundations offer the greatest cost-to-performance ratio for tract homes. Elevated structural slabs are generally only found on custom homes or homes with basements.

Copper piping, commonly used to carry natural gas and water, reacts with concrete over a long period, slowly degrading until the pipe fails. This can lead to what is commonly referred to as slab leaks.  These occur when pipes begin to leak from within the slab.  Signs of a slab leak range from unexplained dampened carpet spots, to drops in water pressure and wet discoloration on exterior foundation walls.  Copper pipes must be lagged (that is, insulated) or run through a conduit or plumbed into the building above the slab.  Electrical conduits through the slab must be water-tight, as they extend below ground level and can potentially expose wiring to groundwater.

See also 
 Argillipedoturbation
 Building construction
 Construction engineering
 Fiber reinforced concrete
 Precast concrete
 Prestressed concrete
 Tie rod
 Rebar
 Steel fixer
 Formwork
 Grade beam

References

External links 

 Raft or Mat Foundations

 
Articles containing video clips
Structural engineering
Civil engineering
Geotechnical engineering
Construction